Charles Major (July 25, 1856 – February 13, 1913) was an American lawyer and novelist.

Biography
Born to an upper-middle class Indianapolis family, Major developed an interest in both law and English history at an early age and attended the University of Michigan from 1872 through 1875, being admitted to the Indiana bar association in 1877. Shortly thereafter he opened his own law practice, which launched a short political career, culminating in a year-long term in the Indiana state legislature.

Writing remained an interest of Major, and in 1898, he published his first novel, When Knighthood Was in Flower under the pseudonym Edwin Caskoden. The novel about England during the reign of King Henry VIII was an exhaustively researched historical romance, and became enormously popular, holding a place on bestselling book lists for nearly three years.  The novel was adapted into a popular Broadway play by Paul Kester in 1901, premiering at the Criterion Theatre that year. The novel also launched relatively successful film adaptations in 1908 and 1922.

With a successful writing career, Major gradually lessened his legal obligations, closing his law practice over a year after his first novel, in 1899. Published in 1902, his third novel, Dorothy Vernon of Haddon Hall, another historical romance, this time set in Elizabethan times, rivaled the success of his first. Once again, the novel was adapted for the theater by Paul Kester, and saw a film release in 1924 starring Mary Pickford.

Major continued to write and publish several additional novels, to varying degrees of success, as well as a number of children's adventure stories, most set in and around his native state of Indiana. Charles Major died of liver cancer on February 13, 1913, at his home in Shelbyville, Indiana.

In 2006, Shelbyville, Indiana native Eric Linne wrote and copyrighted a motion picture screenplay adaptation of Major's novel The Bears of Blue River.

Bibliography
 When Knighthood Was in Flower (1898)
 The Bears of Blue River (1901)
 Dorothy Vernon of Haddon Hall (1902)
 A Forest Hearth: A Romance of Indiana in the Thirties (1903)
 Yolanda: A Maid of Burgundy (1905)
 Uncle Tom Andy Bill: A Story of Bears and Indian Treasure (1908)
 A Gentle Knight of Old Brandenburg (1909) (about Princess Wilhelmine of Prussia and Margravine, consort of Frederick, Margrave of Brandenburg-Bayreuth)
 The Little King: A Story of the Childhood of King Louis XIV (1910)
 Sweet Alyssum (1911)
 The Touchstone of Fortune: Being the Memoir of Baron Clyde etc. (1912)
 Rosalie (1925)

Filmography
Sweet Alyssum, directed by Colin Campbell (1915, based on the story Sweet Alyssum: A Story of the Indiana Oil Fields)
When Knighthood Was in Flower, directed by Robert G. Vignola (1922, based on the novel When Knighthood Was in Flower)
Dorothy Vernon of Haddon Hall, directed by Marshall Neilan (1924, based on the novel Dorothy Vernon of Haddon Hall)
Yolanda, directed by Robert G. Vignola (1924, based on the novel Yolanda)
The Sword and the Rose, directed by Ken Annakin (1953, based on the novel When Knighthood Was in Flower)

External links 

 
 
 
 

1856 births
1913 deaths
19th-century American lawyers
19th-century American male writers
19th-century American novelists
19th-century American politicians
20th-century American male writers
20th-century American novelists
American historical novelists
American male novelists
Deaths from cancer in Indiana
Deaths from liver cancer
Indiana lawyers
Members of the Indiana House of Representatives
Novelists from Indiana
People from Shelbyville, Indiana
University of Michigan alumni
Writers from Indianapolis
Writers of historical fiction set in the early modern period